Zdenek Schneiderwind (born 31 January 1962) is a former speedway rider who competed in speedway, Longtrack and Grasstrack Racing. He reached two World Longtrack world championship Finals as well as thirteen Grand-Prix series. He appeared in eighteen European Grasstrack Champion finals winning the championship twice.

World Longtrack Championship

One Day Finals
 1995  Scheeßel (17th) 5pts
 1996  Herxheim (N/S Reserve)

Grand-Prix Years
 1997 5 app (6th) 65pts
 1998 5 app (11th) 39pts
 1999 5 app (6th) 57pts
 2000 5 app (6th) 51pts
 2001 4 app (15th) 23pts
 2002 2 app (19th) 9pts
 2003 6 app (5th) 65pts
 2004 4 app (8th) 44.5pts
 2005 Semi-finalist
 2006 3 app (9th) 25pts
 2007 3 app (14th) 19pts
 2008 2 app (18th) 19pts
 2090 6 app (16th) 29pts
 2010 1 app (32nd) 0pts

Best Grand-Prix Results
  Marmande Second 2004

Team Championship
 2007  Morizes (4th) 18/37pts (Rode with Richard Wolff, Pavel Ondrašík, Karel Kadlec)
 2008  Werlte (5th) 0/28pts (Rode with Richard Wolff, Pavel Ondrašík, Karel Kadlec)
 2009  Eenrum (5th) 12/27pts (Rode with Richard Wolff, Pavel Ondrašík)
 2010  Morizes (6th) 8/25pts (Rode with Richard Wolff, Pavel Ondrašík, Josef Franc)

European Grasstrack Championship

Finals
 1985  La Reole (12th) 6pts
 1989  La Reole (15th) 5pts
 1991  Werlte (7th) 11pts
 1992  Alken (15th) 3pts
 1994  Cloppenburg (4th) 19pts, After Run-off
 1995  Joure (5th) 15pts
 1996  Joure (Third) 21pts
 1998  Schwarme (Champion) 19pts
 1999  Werlte (Runner-up) 23pts
 2000  St. Colomb de Lauzen (Champion) 23pts
 2001  Noordwolde (Runner-up) 19pts
 2002  Berghaupten (Runner-up) 14pts
 2003  La Reole (5th) 16pts
 2004  Eenrum (7th) 8pts
 2005  Schwarme (20th) 1pt
 2006  La Reole (14th) 4pts
 2007  Folkestone (19th) 0pts
 2008  Siddeburen (18th) 1pt

Semi-finalist
 1986  Siddeburen (15th) 4pts
 1987  Uithuizen (11th) 8pts
 2009  Hertingan (13th) 3pts
 2010  Siddeburen (18th) 1pt

Preliminary round
 1993  Joure (14th) 4pts
 1988  Tonbridge (11th) 8pts

Czech Republic Longtrack Championship
 2003  Marianske Lazne (Champion) 20pts
 2004 Did not compete
 2005  Marianske Lazne (Champion) 15pts
 2006  Marianske Lazne (Champion) 20pts
 2007  Marianske Lazne (Champion) 18pts
 2008  Marianske Lazne (Champion) 18pts
 2009  Marianske Lazne (6th) 16pts
 2010  Marianske Lazne (7th) 10pts

World Final appearances

World Team Cup

 1987 -  Fredericia, Fredericia Speedway,  Coventry, Brandon Stadium,  Prague, Marketa Stadium (with Roman Matousek / Petr Vandirek / Lubomir Jedek / Antonín Kasper Jr.) - 4th - 36pts (4)

References
 http://grasstrackgb.co.uk/zdenek-schneiderwind/
 https://translate.google.co.uk/translate?hl=en&sl=cs&u=http://www.speedwaya-z.cz/%3Fp%3D78&prev=search
 https://sportowefakty.wp.pl/zuzel/zdenek-schneiderwind

1962 births
Living people
Czech speedway riders
Czech motorcycle racers
Individual Speedway Long Track World Championship riders
Expatriate speedway riders in Poland
Team